Yannic Thiel (born 22 October 1989) is a German former professional footballer who played as a defensive midfielder.

References

External links

1989 births
Living people
German footballers
Association football midfielders
3. Liga players
Regionalliga players
Hastings College alumni
SpVgg Unterhaching players
VfL Osnabrück players
German expatriate footballers
German expatriate sportspeople in the United States
College men's soccer players in the United States
Expatriate soccer players in the United States
Footballers from Düsseldorf